Santo António de Nordestinho is a parish in the municipality of Nordeste, Azores in the Portuguese Azores. The population in 2011 was 255, in an area of 7.94 km². The parish was formed on July 16, 2002, when the parish of Nordestinho was split into the parishes Algarvia, Santo António de Nordestinho and São Pedro de Nordestinho.

Sports
The following sports clubs are located in Santo António de Nordestinho:

 CD Santo António Nordestinho

References

Freguesias of Nordeste, Azores